Joan Cooper (23 August 1922 – 1 July 1989) was a British actress.

Her second husband was the actor Arthur Lowe whom she met at the Manchester Repertory Theatre in 1946. They were married at the Register Office, Strand, London, in January 1948. She had three children – Jane Gatehouse and David Gatehouse (children from a previous marriage) and Stephen Lowe (born 1953 at Hammersmith, London, UK).

She had some minor roles alongside him, particularly playing Private Godfrey's sister Dolly in some episodes of Dad's Army.

Lowe died in April 1982, and five years later Cooper moved to his parents' cottage in Hayfield, Derbyshire, which had been vacant since his mother's death in 1981. She lived there until her death from stomach cancer at the age of 66.

Filmography

References

External links
 

1922 births
1989 deaths
British television actresses
20th-century British actresses
People from Wolverhampton
Deaths from stomach cancer
Deaths from cancer in England